Reidar Høilund (13 June 1901 – 29 April 1974) was a Norwegian footballer. He played in six matches for the Norway national football team from 1921 to 1923.

References

External links
 

1901 births
1974 deaths
Norwegian footballers
Norway international footballers
Place of birth missing
Association footballers not categorized by position